Volkhovsky (masculine), Volkhovskaya (feminine), or Volkhovskoye (neuter) may refer to:
Volkhovsky District, a district of Leningrad Oblast, Russia
Volkhovskoye Urban Settlement, a municipal formation corresponding to Volkhovskoye Settlement Municipal Formation, an administrative division of Volkhovsky District of Leningrad Oblast, Russia
Volkhovskaya, a rural locality (a village) in Syamzhensky District of Vologda Oblast, Russia